Mr. Murder is a 1998 American science fiction-crime thriller television miniseries starring Stephen Baldwin based on the 1993 book of the same name by Dean Koontz. It was first broadcast in New Zealand on September 21, 1998. The first part then aired on ABC in the United States on Monday, April 26, 1999, at 9:00 p.m. and the finale aired on Thursday, April 29, at 9:00 p.m.

Synopsis
Father and Son Drew Oslett Sr.(James Coburn) and Jr. (Thomas Haden Church) are shadowy operatives who create assassins and now through pioneering genetically engineering and cloning intend to create a perfect untraceable assassin. After electrocuting their intended candidate to gain his DNA, the tissue samples are contaminated and replaced by those belonging to Marty Stillwater (Stephen Baldwin) who is a successful mystery novel writer. Seven years later his clone Alfie is genetically engineered to be a perfect soldier and has been conditioned to be a remorseless killing machine. But unbeknownst to his creators he has developed a telepathic bond with Marty along with Remote Viewing capabilities. The clone is jealous of Marty's life and family, and intends to replace Marty. This intention prompts the Osletts to take a hit out on all the Stillwaters.

Cast 
 Stephen Baldwin as Marty Stillwater/Alfie
 Julie Warner as Paige Stillwater
 Bill Smitrovich as Lt. Lowbock
 Thomas Haden Church as Drew Oslett Jr.
 James Coburn as Drew Oslett Sr.
 Kaley Cuoco as Charlotte Stillwater
 Brittney Lee Harvey as Emily Stillwater
 Don Hood as James Stillwater
 K Callan as Alice Stillwater
 Dan Lauria as Gen. Aames
 Don McManus as Carl Clocker
 Dennis Creaghan as Gen. Greydon Lamont
 Bertila Damas as Det. Beatrice Del Rio
 Richard Riehle as John Wexel
 Brandon Smith as Sen. James Ewald

Production
Koontz sold the film rights to Mr. Murder to Savoy Pictures after the book's publication.  The adaptation was initially scheduled to be a big budget theatrical feature in 1996 starring Bruce Willis as Marty Stillwater and to be directed by Uli Edel.  However, this version never came into fruition.

With the feature film unable to get off the ground, the rights were sold to a different production company that developed the project as a miniseries on a much smaller budget. This adaptation was directed by Dick Lowry from a teleplay by Stephen Tolkin.  The cast included Stephen Baldwin as Marty Stillwater, Julie Warner as Paige Stillwater, Thomas Haden Church as Drew Oslett Jr., and James Coburn as Drew Oslett Sr., a character not in the book. It was broadcast in New Zealand on September 21, 1998, and was later broadcast in the United States on ABC on April 26 and April 29, 1999.

Reception
Ray Richmond of Variety.com gave the miniseries a negative review, writing that it did not make any sense and that the only difference between the identical twins was their manner of speaking.

References

External links

1998 television films
1998 films
1990s American television miniseries
1998 crime thriller films
1990s science fiction films
American crime thriller films
American science fiction thriller films
Crime television films
Films about cloning
Films about families
Films about murderers
Films about identity theft
Films based on American horror novels
Films based on science fiction novels
Films based on works by Dean Koontz
Films directed by Dick Lowry
American science fiction television films
American thriller television films
Films with screenplays by Stephen Tolkin
1990s American films